Tephroseris is a genus of Eurasian and North American plants in the groundsel tribe within the daisy family.

The following species are recognised in the genus Tephroseris:

Tephroseris adenolepis 
Tephroseris × arctisibirica 
Tephroseris balbisiana 
Tephroseris cladobotrys 
Tephroseris crassifolia 
Tephroseris crispa 
Tephroseris flammea 
Tephroseris frigida 
Tephroseris furusei 
Tephroseris gurensis 
Tephroseris helenitis 
Tephroseris hieraciiformis 
Tephroseris integrifolia 
Tephroseris jacutica 
Tephroseris kawakamii 
Tephroseris kirilowii 
Tephroseris kjellmanii 
Tephroseris koreana 
Tephroseris lindstroemii 
Tephroseris longifolia 
Tephroseris newcombei 
Tephroseris ochotensis 
Tephroseris palustris 
Tephroseris papposa 
Tephroseris phaeantha 
Tephroseris pierotii 
Tephroseris porphyrantha 
Tephroseris praticola 
Tephroseris pricei 
Tephroseris pseudoaurantiaca 
Tephroseris pseudosonchus 
Tephroseris pyroglossa 
Tephroseris rufa 
Tephroseris schistosa 
Tephroseris sichotensis 
Tephroseris stolonifera 
Tephroseris subdentata 
Tephroseris subfrigida 
Tephroseris subscaposa 
Tephroseris sukaczevii 
Tephroseris taitoensis 
Tephroseris takedana 
Tephroseris turczaninovii 
Tephroseris vereszczaginii 
Tephroseris yukonensis

References

Senecioneae
Asteraceae genera
Taxa named by Ludwig Reichenbach